Interstate 95 Business may refer to the following Business Interstate Highways that connect to Interstate 95: 

Interstate 95 Business (Brunswick, Georgia)
Interstate 95 Business (Darien, Georgia)
Interstate 95 Business (North Carolina), serving the Fayetteville area
Interstate 95 Business (Rocky Mount, North Carolina), a former business route
Interstate 95 Business (Walterboro, South Carolina)

95
Business
95